Ala Rishani [علاء ريشاني in Arabic] (born 30 October 1987) is a Saudi football player.

Honours

Al-Ahli (Jeddah)
Saudi Federation cup: 2007
Gulf Club Champions Cup: 2008
Saudi Champions Cup: 2011

References

Sportspeople from Jeddah
1987 births
Living people
Saudi Arabian footballers
Al-Ahli Saudi FC players
Ettifaq FC players
Al-Taawoun FC players
Al-Faisaly FC players
Khaleej FC players
Saudi Professional League players
Association football midfielders